John Anthony Gorrie  (born 10 March 1950) is the first Aboriginal Australian person awarded the Public Service Medal, in 2005. 

Born in Melbourne in 1950, Gorrie was removed from his mother as a baby, but the authorities returned him to her after she got married, and he grew up with her at Lake Tyers Mission. He is a Kurnai elder of the Krauatungalung clan, whose traditional lands are located in East Gippsland in Victoria.

He started work as an Aboriginal liaison officer in the (Victorian) Department of Community Services in 1991, and was the only Indigenous worker there when he began.

After working for 14 years in the field of child protection, he was given the award "for outstanding public service in improving the relationship between the Department and the Aboriginal community". As a result of his work, new programs were created by the Department, and Aboriginal people's interactions with the department improved.

His daughter is writer Veronica Gorrie, and his grandchild is writer, actor and activist Nayuka Gorrie.

References

1950 births
Australian Aboriginal elders
Living people
People from Melbourne
Public servants of Victoria (Australia)
Recipients of the Public Service Medal (Australia)
Gunaikurnai people